Jeffrey Michael Serowik (born January 10, 1967) is an American former professional ice hockey defenseman. He played 28 games in the National Hockey League with the Toronto Maple Leafs, Boston Bruins, and Pittsburgh Penguins between 1990 and 1998. The rest of his career, which lasted from 1990 to 2000, was spent in the minor leagues.

Playing career
Serowick was drafted 85th overall by the Toronto Maple Leafs in the 1985 NHL Entry Draft and played one game for them during the 1990–91 NHL season. He mainly played in the American Hockey League for the St. John's Maple Leafs. He signed with the Florida Panthers in 1993, but spent the entire season in the International Hockey League with the Cincinnati Cyclones, thus never playing a game for the Panthers.

In 1994, Serowik signed with the Boston Bruins and played a second NHL game. Like his Toronto stint, he played mainly in the AHL, suiting up for the Providence Bruins. He signed with the Chicago Blackhawks in 1995 but never played for them, instead playing in the IHL, splitting the season with the Indianapolis Ice and the Las Vegas Thunder. He stayed in the IHL with a second year at Las Vegas and then with the Kansas City Blades.

In 1998, he signed with the Pittsburgh Penguins and got more ice time, playing 26 games and scoring 6 assists before suffering a serious head injury.  He missed the rest of that season and the entire 1999–00 NHL season before eventually retiring.

Career statistics

Regular season and playoffs

Awards and honors

External links

1965 births
Living people
American men's ice hockey defensemen
Boston Bruins players
Cincinnati Cyclones (IHL) players
Ice hockey people from New Hampshire
Indianapolis Ice players
Kansas City Blades players
Las Vegas Thunder players
Newmarket Saints players
Sportspeople from Manchester, New Hampshire
Pittsburgh Penguins players
Providence Bruins players
Providence Friars men's ice hockey players
St. John's Maple Leafs players
Toronto Maple Leafs draft picks
Toronto Maple Leafs players